Leandro Aparecido Padilha de Oliveira (born January 2, 1988 in Campo Grande), is a Brazilian football midfielder who plays for Noroeste.

External links

  Ogol
  Soccerway
  Sambafoot

1988 births
Living people
Association football forwards
Brazilian footballers
Brazilian expatriate footballers
Santa Cruz Futebol Clube players
Comercial Futebol Clube (Ribeirão Preto) players
Guaratinguetá Futebol players
Al-Faisaly FC players
Thespakusatsu Gunma players
Ituano FC players
Paraná Clube players
Associação Desportiva São Caetano players
Rio Claro Futebol Clube players
Londrina Esporte Clube players
Clube Atlético Bragantino players
Associação Atlética Caldense players
Esporte Clube Comercial (MS) players
Clube Atlético Patrocinense players
Moto Club de São Luís players
Esporte Clube Noroeste players
Campeonato Brasileiro Série B players
Campeonato Brasileiro Série C players
Campeonato Brasileiro Série D players
J2 League players
Saudi Professional League players
Expatriate footballers in Saudi Arabia
Brazilian expatriate sportspeople in Saudi Arabia
Expatriate footballers in Japan
Brazilian expatriate sportspeople in Japan
Association football midfielders
Sportspeople from Mato Grosso do Sul
People from Campo Grande